Redmond Gleeson (born Martin Gleeson; January 26, 1935 – May 6, 2020) was an Irish-born American stage, film, and television actor.

Life and career
Martin Gleeson was born in Dublin on January 26, 1935. He won a scholarship to study theatre arts at Miami University in Ohio. After graduating he lived in Aspen, Colorado where he co-founded and acted with the High Country Players.

In 1968 he moved from Aspen to Los Angeles where he has appeared in many stage productions, including Look Homeward Angel, Buddy's Girl, for which he won a Drama-Logue Award, and Kevin's Bed, for which he won a Back Stage Garland Award.

In addition to his film and television work, he produced, directed and has acted for years in the adaptation of Bloomsday, he co-wrote with T.S. Kerrigan. Gleeson had nine children. Another, the eldest, Raynard Martin Gleeson, predeceased his parents. When not acting, Gleeson resided in Kalimantan, Indonesia with his wife, Mardiah. He died on May 6, 2020, at the age of 85.

Filmography

Films

Television

References

External links
 
 

1935 births
2020 deaths
Irish male film actors
Irish emigrants to the United States
Irish male television actors
American male stage actors
Male actors from Dublin (city)
Male actors from Los Angeles
People from Central Kalimantan